Jan Ensing, or Ensingh (10 March 1819, Groningen - 19 December 1894, Vlaardingen) was a Dutch painter, graphic artist, and lithographer; primarily known for his portraits.

Life and work 

He was born to Jan Ensing (1797-1867), a shopkeeper and merchant, and his wife, Geertje née Kuipers. In 1840, his painting of a taproom at a village inn won an award from "", a visual arts society. He received another award from Pictura in 1842, for his painting of horses in a duck pond. 

That same year, he married Catharina Jager. Their daughter, Paula, would marry Paulus Kikkert (1839-1909); a shipowner and herring trader from Vlaardingen. During his frequent visits to see her, he sketched the local fishermen and their wives. Their son, Johannes (1843-1887), was a doctor in Texel and Schagen. 

He had a varied teaching career. In 1850, he became a teacher at the Academie Minerva. He also taught at various other schools in Groningen: from 1861 to 1872, he taught at a school for young women; from 1864 to 1891, at a "Kweekschool", for training elementary school teachers and, from 1879 to 1891, at the Normal School. In 1874, he was elected a board member of Pictura.

In 1854, he was commissioned to paint the portraits of nineteen professors at the University of Groningen, to celebrate the opening of their new Academy Building. This was the beginning of a larger portrait gallery, which is now housed in the Senate Chamber of the current Academy Building (a replacement for the earlier one, which was destroyed by a fire in 1906).

He retired from his teaching positions in 1891, and went to live with his daughter's family in Vlaardingen.

A major retrospective was held in 1981 at the Groninger Museum. A street in the Hoogkerk district of Groningen has been named after him.

References

Further reading 
 J. Schuller tot Peursum-Meijer, Jan Ensing 1819-1894. Tekenaar, schilder en onderwijzer te Groningen, Groningen, Universiteitsmuseum, 1981
 R. E. O. Ekkart and J. Schuller tot Peursum-Meijer: Groninger academieportretten: catalogus van de portretten in het Academiegebouw en de Bibliotheek der Rijksuniversiteit te Groningen, Van der Kamp, Groningen, 1978

External links 

1819 births
1894 deaths
Dutch painters
Dutch portrait painters
Dutch lithographers
Dutch genre painters
Painters from Groningen